Europinidin (Eu) is an O-methylated anthocyanidin. It is a water-soluble, bluish red plant dye. It is a rare O-methylated flavonoid, a derivative of delphinidin. It can be found in some species of Plumbago and Ceratostigma.

References 

O-methylated anthocyanidins
Catechols